Lindsay Davenport and Corina Morariu were the defending champions, but Morariu did not compete this year. Davenport teamed up with Anna Kournikova and ended as runners-up.

Lisa Raymond and Rennae Stubbs won the title by defeating Davenport and Kournikova 4–6, 6–3, 7–6(8–6) in the final. It was the 18th title for Raymond and the 24th title for Stubbs in their respective doubles careers. It was also the 4th title for the pair during the season, after their wins in the Australian Open, Rome and Madrid.

Seeds

Draw

Draw

External links
 Main and Qualifying draws

Southern California Open
2000 WTA Tour